"The Oath" is the twelfth episode of the first season of the period drama television series The Americans. It originally aired on FX in the United States on April 24, 2013.

Plot
Sanford Prince (Tim Hopper) tells KGB agent Elizabeth Jennings (Keri Russell) that he has recruited an Air Force colonel named Lyle Rennhull who will give the Soviets important information on the SDI project for $50,000. Elizabeth brings this new information to her husband Philip (Matthew Rhys), who is wary, citing Prince's gambling addiction. Elizabeth believes Sanford is delivering them the "highest source" within the Reagan administration, while Philip believes it could be a trap.

Elizabeth receives material from Prince at a dead drop, containing schematics for the U.S. missile defense system. She meets Claudia (Margo Martindale) who believes that the Americans wouldn't hand over such important information just as a trap, telling Elizabeth that she believes the Colonel is real and a meeting with him has been set. Elizabeth has grown tired of Claudia as their handler and tells Philip that she wants her to be reassigned. Philip resolves to convince FBI employee Martha (Alison Wright) to plant a bug in Gaad's office to see if the FBI are planning anything. Later, while at dinner, Philip (disguised as FBI counterintelligence agent Clark) proposes to Martha, who happily accepts.

Nina's (Annet Mahendru) suspicions about Stan Beeman (Noah Emmerich) grow and she accuses him of murdering Vlad, which he strongly denies. Philip asks Martha to plant a listening device in Gaad's office and she agrees. Viola Johnson (Tonye Patano), who planted the bugged clock in Weinberger's study, has been feeling increasingly guilty, and eventually confesses to the FBI. She tells Stan and Gaad what happened, and they surmise that Viola was threatened by the same couple who kidnapped Patterson. Viola agrees to speak to a sketch artist. The FBI discover the bug in Weinberger's study and decide to leave it there now that they know the Russians are listening.

After planting the bug, Martha confronts Philip about their relationship, complaining that they have to keep it secret. Philip agrees that she can tell her parents about the marriage and Martha tells him she wants to get married over the weekend. Philip and Elizabeth listen in on the bug in Gaad's office, where they hear no mention of a trap. Sanford is arrested one night for failing to pay his child support. Elizabeth fears this has something to do with the meeting with the Colonel. At Philip (assuming the identity of Clark Westerfeld) and Martha's wedding ceremony, Elizabeth attends as "Clark's sister" and Claudia attends as his mother. Elizabeth asks Philip if their relationship would be different if they had had a wedding ceremony and taken vows, and Philip says he doesn't know.

Viola's time with the sketch artist results in the FBI looking for a white couple in their 30s or 40s. Nina, who has grown increasingly tired of Stan's lies, confesses to Arkady about spying for the U.S. and volunteers to become a re-doubled agent.

Production
The episode was written by Joshua Brand and Melissa James Gibson and directed by John Dahl.

Reception
In its original American broadcast on April 24, 2013, "The Oath" was watched by 1.49 million viewers, according to Nielsen ratings.

References

External links
 

The Americans (season 1) episodes
2013 American television episodes
Television episodes directed by John Dahl